Iain Armitage (born July 15, 2008) is an American child actor. He is known for starring as Sheldon Cooper in Young Sheldon, a prequel to The Big Bang Theory, and Ziggy Chapman in Big Little Lies. In 2018, Armitage received the Young Artist Award for Best Performance in a TV Series Leading Young Actor for the former role. He also provided the voice for young Shaggy Rogers in Scoob! (2020), and for the police puppy Chase in PAW Patrol: The Movie (2021).

Early life
Armitage resides in Arlington, Virginia, and is the son of the actor Euan Morton, who was born in Falkirk, Scotland, and theater producer Lee Armitage. It is possible he was named after his father, whose birth name was actually Iain. He is the grandson of former United States Deputy Secretary of State, Richard Lee Armitage.

Career

2010s
Armitage first gained prominence via his YouTube series Iain Loves Theatre where he reviews stage shows from musical theater. His videos caught the attention of the theater industry, including a couple of agents who wanted to sign him up. During the 2015 Tony Awards, he served as a correspondent for Perez Hilton and was even referenced in the opening number of the show.

In January 2017, Armitage starred in an episode of Law & Order: Special Victims Unit ("Chasing Theo"), playing a young child, Theo Lachere, who has been kidnapped. He appeared in Impractical Jokers "Look Out Below", where he was talked to by Murr in "Who Let The Dogs Out?", in the second challenge of that episode. His videos caught the attention of the theater industry, including a couple of agents who wanted to sign him up. He played Ziggy Chapman in the HBO miniseries Big Little Lies and he appeared in The Glass Castle, a film adaptation of Jeannette Walls' memoir of the same name. In the same year, he was also in the films I'm Not Here and Our Souls at Night, which also starred Jane Fonda and Robert Redford.

In 2017, Armitage was cast as Sheldon Cooper as a child in Young Sheldon, a prequel to the sitcom The Big Bang Theory. In December 2018, he appeared in an episode of The Big Bang Theory, playing young Sheldon on a videotape recording intended to cheer up and encourage an older Sheldon.

2020s
In 2020, Armitage voiced young Shaggy Rogers in the Scooby-Doo film Scoob!. He was set to reprise the role in the film Scoob: Holiday Haunt, which was set for release in late 2022 on HBO Max, but it was canceled in August 2022.

In 2021, Armitage voiced Chase in PAW Patrol: The Movie, replacing Justin Paul Kelly from the Nickelodeon television series.

Filmography

Film

Television

Web

Awards and nominations

References

External links
 

2008 births
Living people
American male child actors
Place of birth missing (living people)
21st-century American male actors
American people of Scottish descent
American male film actors
American male television actors
American male voice actors
American theater critics
Actors from Virginia
People from Arlington County, Virginia
Actors from Georgia (U.S. state)